

231001–231100 

|-id=040
| 231040 Kakaras ||  || Gunaras Kakaras (born 1939) is a Lithuanian astronomer and one of the most skilled Lithuanian popularizers of astronomy. He is an expert on stellar photometry of binary stars and he wrote several popular books and many popular papers. He established the Lithuanian Museum of Ethnocosmology in 1990. || 
|}

231101–231200 

|-bgcolor=#f2f2f2
| colspan=4 align=center | 
|}

231201–231300 

|-id=265
| 231265 Saulperlmutter ||  || Saul Perlmutter (born 1959), an American physicist and Nobel laureate || 
|-id=278
| 231278 Kárpáti ||  || Rudolf Kárpáti (1920–1999), a Hungarian fencer who won six gold medals in sabre at four Olympic Games between 1948 and 1960 || 
|}

231301–231400 

|-id=307
| 231307 Peterfalk ||  || Peter Falk (1927–2011), an American actor || 
|-id=346
| 231346 Taofanlin ||  || Tao Fan-Lin, director of the Taipei amateur astronomers association || 
|}

231401–231500 

|-id=446
| 231446 Dayao ||  || Dayao County is located in the north-central Yunnan Province of China. It has a long history, rich mineral resources and good astronomical observing conditions. Dayao was ranked one of the most beautiful counties of China in 2020. || 
|-id=470
| 231470 Bedding ||  || Tim Bedding (born 1966), a full professor at the University of Sydney. || 
|-id=486
| 231486 Capefearrock ||  || The Cape Fear High School in Fayetteville, North Carolina, United States. Since 1996, dozens of its students have submitted thousands of near-Earth objects observations to the MPC. || 
|}

231501–231600 

|-id=555
| 231555 Christianeurda ||  || Christiane-Urda Süßenberger (born 1967), wife of German discoverer Uwe Süßenberger || 
|}

231601–231700 

|-id=609
| 231609 Sarcander || 2009 RV || Michael Sarcander (born 1955), German astronomer and long-time technical manager of the planetarium in Mannheim, has produced many educational shows for the general public. He has published several hundred observing tips for asteroids reaching a favorable apparition or closely approaching other celestial objects. || 
|-id=649
| 231649 Korotkiy ||  || Stanislav Alexandrovich Korotkiy (born 1983), a Russian amateur astronomer and discoverer of minor planets || 
|-id=666
| 231666 Aisymnos ||  || Aesymnus (Aisymnos), ruler of the Achaeans (Danaans) and Greek warrior from Greek mythology. He was killed by Hektor during the Trojan War. || 
|}

231701–231800 

|-bgcolor=#f2f2f2
| colspan=4 align=center | 
|}

231801–231900 

|-bgcolor=#f2f2f2
| colspan=4 align=center | 
|}

231901–232000 

|-id=969
| 231969 Sebvauclair ||  || Sebastien Vauclair (born 1976) is a French astronomer working on high-energy astronomy. He is also a leader in dark-sky protection, especially for the dark-sky reserve known as the Reserve Internationale de Ciel Etoile du Pic du Midi, located in the Pyrenees. || 
|}

References 

231001-232000